Onarheim is a village in Tysnes municipality in Vestland county, Norway.  The village is located on the southeastern shores of the island of Tysnesøya, along the Hardangerfjorden.  The village has been home to a church since the 12th century. The present Onarheim Church was built in 1893, and it serves the southeastern part of the municipality.  There is also a small school in Onarheim.

References

Villages in Vestland
Tysnes